Fuad Anwar Amin (born 13 October 1972) is a Saudi Arabian former professional footballer who played as a defensive midfielder. On club level, he played mostly for Al-Shabab and Al-Nasr in his home country.

International career
A former captain of the national team, he achieved national fame after becoming the first Saudi to score in the FIFA World Cup finals in the 2–1 defeat against the Netherlands during 1994 edition. In the same competition, he scored a long range effort against Morocco.

Amin played at the 1996 Summer Olympics.

Amin was also selected for 1998 FIFA World Cup. During the match against France, Amin was stomped by Zidane, who was banned for two games. People close to Zidane said that Amin had leveled a racial slur against the player.

Honours

Al-Shabab
Saudi Federation cup: 1988, 1989.
Saudi Premier League: 1991, 1992, 1993.
Crown Prince Cup: 1993, 1996.
Arab Champions League: 1992
Arab Super Cup: 1996
Gulf Club Champions Cup: 1993, 1994

National Team U-17
AFC U-17 Championship: 1988
FIFA U-17 World Cup: 1989

National Team
AFC Asian Cup
Winner: 1996
Runner Up: 1992

Gulf Cup of Nations
Winner: 1994

Qualify for the FIFA World Cup:
1994, 1998

References

External links

1972 births
Living people
Sportspeople from Riyadh
Saudi Arabian footballers
Saudi Arabia international footballers
Saudi Arabian expatriate footballers
1992 King Fahd Cup players
1992 AFC Asian Cup players
1994 FIFA World Cup players
1995 King Fahd Cup players
1996 AFC Asian Cup players
1998 FIFA World Cup players
AFC Asian Cup-winning players
Footballers at the 1996 Summer Olympics
Olympic footballers of Saudi Arabia
Expatriate footballers in China
Saudi Arabian expatriate sportspeople in China
Al-Shabab FC (Riyadh) players
Al Nassr FC players
Footballers at the 1990 Asian Games
Association football midfielders
Saudi Professional League players
Asian Games competitors for Saudi Arabia
21st-century Saudi Arabian people
20th-century Saudi Arabian people